POW! WOW! is an international mural arts festival founded by Jasper Wong in Hong Kong in 2009. In 2010, the first edition of POW! WOW! as a week-long mural arts festival was held in Honolulu, Hawaii. The festival has since exhibited in 17 cities worldwide with the purpose of city beautification and community building.  Past festivals have also featured local restaurants, partnerships with local sports teams, illuminated art installations, and musical performances from artists such as Eminem.

While POW! WOW! shares the name of the Native American pow wow gathering, the festival's name originates combining the "Pow" of comic book action bubbles with the "WOW" of a reader's reaction.

In April 2020, POW! WOW! celebrated its tenth anniversary by releasing a 256-page hardcover book through Paragon Books. All international editions of the festival are represented through a photo reportage of a mural created there at least once.

Notable Participants 
 Amy Sol
 Shepard Fairey
 Allison "Hueman" Torneros

Festival Years

References

External links
 POW! WOW! Worldwide website
 POW! WOW! DC

Street art festivals
Graffiti and unauthorised signage
Street art